Robert J. Corts (March 5, 1917 – August 25, 2013) was an American judge and politician who was a member of the Ohio Senate. Representing the 13th District from 1969−1974, Corts represented the area in and around Lorain.

Corts died August 25, 2013.

References

1917 births
Republican Party Ohio state senators
2013 deaths